Surfing competitions at the 2019 Pan American Games were held between July 30th and August 4th, 2019 at  beach in the Punta Negra District of Peru.

The sport of surfing will be making its Pan American Games debut. In July 2015, days before the 2015 Pan American Games in Toronto, Canada, the then Pan American Sports Organization added the sport to the Pan American Games sports program. In 2016, the International Olympic Committee made several changes to its sports program, which were subsequently implemented for these games. Surfing was added, but was already included in the 2019 program a year earlier.

8 medal events are scheduled to be contested. Four per each gender A total of 88 surfers will qualify to compete at the games.

The event will be used as a qualifier for the  2020 Summer Olympics in Tokyo, Japan.

Medal summary

Medal table

Men's events

Women's events

Qualification

A total of 88 surfers will qualify across various qualification tournaments. The host nation Peru, will be automatically be allocated ten quota spots across the eight events. A country can enter a maximum ten surfers (five per gender).

See also
Surfing at the 2020 Summer Olympics

References

External links
Results book

 
Events at the 2019 Pan American Games
Pan American Games
2019
Pan American Games
Surfing in Peru
Pan American Games